Oliver Dinsdale Wright (12 June 1947 – 28 December 2018) was a Jamaican boxer. He competed at the 1968 Summer Olympics in the middleweight category and the 1972 Summer Olympics in the light-heavyweight category. As a light-heavyweight, Wright won a silver medal at the 1970 British Commonwealth Games and a bronze medal at the 1970 Central American and Caribbean Games.

During Wright's professional career, which lasted from 1973 to 1981, he fought the likes of Larry Holmes, Tim Witherspoon, Earnie Shavers and Oscar Bonavena in the heavyweight class. Wright had a professional record of 16-16-1.

References

External links
 

1947 births
2018 deaths
Middleweight boxers
Light-heavyweight boxers
Heavyweight boxers
Jamaican male boxers
Olympic boxers of Jamaica
Boxers at the 1968 Summer Olympics
Boxers at the 1972 Summer Olympics
Boxers at the 1970 British Commonwealth Games
Commonwealth Games silver medallists for Jamaica
Commonwealth Games medallists in boxing
Boxers at the 1971 Pan American Games
Pan American Games competitors for Jamaica
Competitors at the 1970 Central American and Caribbean Games
Central American and Caribbean Games bronze medalists for Jamaica
People from Mandeville, Jamaica
Central American and Caribbean Games medalists in boxing
20th-century Jamaican people
21st-century Jamaican people
Medallists at the 1970 British Commonwealth Games